Christopher Milburn  is an English actor and producer. He appeared in Casualty, as well the last two series of Rumpole of the Bailey as the title character's handsome colleague, Dave Inchcape.

He transitioned into film producing in the mid 1990s, debuting with the 1997 comedy Caught In The Act. He has since worked on both British and American productions, including An American Haunting and The Hurricane Heist. He has collaborated several times with filmmaker Courtney Solomon.

Filmography (Producer)
 Dreaming of Joseph Lees (1999)
 Relative Values (2000)
 An American Haunting (2005)
 Perkins' 14 (2009)
 The Task (2011)
 Legendary (2013)
 Getaway (2013)
 Outcast (2014)
 The Hunter's Prayer (2017)
 The Hurricane Heist (2018)

References

External links

English film producers
English male television actors
Living people
Year of birth missing (living people)